The following is a list of modern-day couples recognized by various Christian denominations to have lived such an exemplary holy lives in marriage and are under the process for canonization.

Catholic Church

Under canonization process

Martyred couples

Considered for sainthood

Orthodox Church
Saints Peter of Murom (1167-1228) and Fevronia of Murom (1175-1228), Russian Orthodox Couple; Prince and Princess of Murom; Wonderworkers (Russia)
 Saints Stefan Uroš IV Dušan (ca. 1308–1355) and Helena (1332-1359), Eastern Orthodox Couple; King and Queen of Serbia (Serbia-Bulgaria)
 Saints Dmitri Donskoy (1350-1389) and Eudoxia of Moscow (1353-1407), Russian Orthodox Couple; Grand Prince and Princess of Moscow (Russia)
 Saints Nikolay Aleksandrovich Romanov (1868-1918) and Alexandra Feodorovna Romanova (1872-1918), Russian Orthodox Couple; Emperor and Empress of Russia; Martyrs (Germany-Russia)

References

External links
 Santi Sposi From Santi e Beati website.
 CatholicSaints.Info

Saints duos

venerated